Bald Eagle is an unincorporated community located in Bath County, Kentucky, United States.

References

Unincorporated communities in Bath County, Kentucky
Unincorporated communities in Kentucky